The Hazfi Cup 2004-05 is the 18th staging of Iran's football knockout competition.

1/8 Finals

Quarterfinals

Semifinals

Final

Leg 1

Leg 2

See also
 2004–05 Iran Pro League
 2004–05 Iran Football's 2nd Division

References 
 

2004
2004–05 domestic association football cups
2004–05 in Iranian football